Bentley Crag is a rock crag rising to about  north of Seue Peaks on Arrowsmith Peninsula in Graham Land. It was mapped by the Falkland Islands Dependencies Survey from surveys and from air photos, 1956–59, and named by the UK Antarctic Place-Names Committee after Wilson A. Bentley, American meteorologist and specialist in microphotography of snow and ice crystals; joint author with W.J. Humphreys of Snow Crystals.

References
 

Cliffs of Graham Land
Loubet Coast